André Lourenço da Silva (born 9 February 1975) is a French-born Portuguese rugby union player, who plays as a prop. Born in Paris, he had his debut in French rugby for Racing Club de France, aged 17.

He already played for RC Orléans, CA Périgueux, CS Bourgoin-Jallieu, RC Toulon and RC Nîmes. He played for Stade Montois, for the season of 2007/08, and plays for RC Carqueiranne-Hyères, since 2008/09.

He chose to represent Portugal, having his debut the same year, at 10 March 2007, with Uruguay, in a 12-5, at the repechage for the Rugby World Cup qualifying. He was on the squad that went to 2007 Rugby World Cup finals, playing two matches, being the last one with Italy, at a 31–5 loss. He had five games without scoring for the Portuguese squad by the end of the tournament, and has been absent from the national team since.

External links
André Silva International Statistics

References

1975 births
Living people
Rugby union players from Paris
Citizens of Portugal through descent
Portuguese rugby union players
French rugby union players
French people of Portuguese descent
Rugby union props
Portugal international rugby union players
CA Périgueux players